Clevedon Shore is a 0.38 hectare geological Site of Special Scientific Interest adjacent to the Severn Estuary at Clevedon, North Somerset, notified in 1991.

It is the side of a mineralised fault, which runs east-west adjacent to the pier, and forms a small cliff feature in dolomitic conglomerate on the north side of Clevedon Beach, containing cream to pink baryte together with sulphides. The minerals identified at the site include: haematite, chalcopyrite, tennantite, galena, tetrahedrite, bornite, pyrite, marcasite, enargite and sphalerite. Secondary alteration of this assemblage has produced idaite, Covellite and other Copper sulphides.

The site is listed as a Geological Conservation Review site as several of the minerals found here are rare, in particular the beudantite. The presence of copper and arsenic is unusual for the Mendip district.

References

Sites of Special Scientific Interest in Avon
Sites of Special Scientific Interest notified in 1991
Clevedon